National Highway 944 (NH 944) is a short Indian National Highway entirely within the state of Tamil Nadu. This  highway links Nagercoil in Kanyakumari district to Kavalkinaru in Tirunelveli District.

See also 
 List of National Highways in India (by Highway Number)
 National Highways Development Project

References

National highways in India
944